Enneanectes altivelis, known commonly as the lofty triplefin, is a species of triplefin blenny. It is widely distributed in the warmer waters of the western Atlantic from the southern Florida to Touros in Brazil, including the Caribbean and the Gulf of Mexico.

References

altivelis
Fish described in 1960
Fish of the Atlantic Ocean